Henrique Manuel da Silva Calisto (born 16 October 1953) is a Portuguese retired footballer who played as a right back, and is a manager.

After his playing career ended he became a manager, taking charge of numerous clubs, mainly in Portugal, and also managed the Vietnamese national team.

Playing career
Born in Matosinhos, Calisto played three seasons in the Primeira Liga with local Leixões SC. His best output consisted of 17 matches (one goal) in 1973–74, with the team finishing in 14th position.

Calisto retired from professional football in June 1978 at only 24, after one season with A.D. Fafe in the second division.

Coaching career

Portugal
Calisto begun coaching at the age of only 26, leading Boavista F.C. to fourth in the 1980–81 season, recording nine wins, four draws and only lost two games in his 15 matches in charge.

He spent the following four years between Boavista and their Porto neighbours S.C. Salgueiros, winning the second division in 1982 and finishing the following season in 10th. His return to Boavista was also successful, with the club finishing 7th.

After only a few months in charge of S.C. Braga, Calisto joined fellow league side Varzim S.C. in the summer of 1986, where he made another division rise at a time when he reached a run of 17 games without losing. It was this season that saw the emergence of Rui Barros, a striker who, a year later, was an important figure at FC Porto and joined Juventus in 1988.

In 1988, he coached Académica de Coimbra. His tenure was a success with 31 wins in 48 matches on all fronts.

Afterwards, he faced the challenges with Penafiel, Chaves and Rio Ave. It was in Rio Ave that he won the second division in his first full season there. He completed the campaign at the helm of F.C. Paços de Ferreira, in one of several stints he had at the Estádio da Mata Real. In 1998/99, he achieved another promotion with Paços, with 20 wins in 36 matches.

In the 2011–12 season, Calisto returned to Paços for his third spell and brought them from last to 10th at the end of the season.

Asia
Calisto spent eight seasons at the helm of Đồng Tâm Long An F.C. in Vietnam, where he won two V.League 1 titles, and achieved five other top-three finishes. In March 2008, he was hired as head coach of the Vietnamese football team, leading it to its first ASEAN Football Championship title.

Calisto quit his job as national side coach on 2 March 2011. He had been criticised over poor performances at the 2010 AFF Suzuki Cup, and was appointed at Thai club Muangthong United F.C. the following week.

Africa / Return to Portugal
In mid-February 2013, Calisto was appointed at C.R.D. Libolo in Angola. He returned to his country on 30 October of that year, however, replacing fired Costinha at the helm of former team Paços which ranked last in the league with only one win and one draw from eight games. On 24 February 2014 he was dismissed after a 4–0 loss at Vitória FC, having won two of his 12 games and the team in the same position.

Honours

Club
Rio Ave
Liga de Honra: 1995–96

Đồng Tâm Long An
V.League 1: 2005, 2006
V.League 2: 2001–02
Vietnamese National Cup: 2005
Vietnamese Super Cup: 2006

International
Vietnam
ASEAN Football Championship
Champion: 2008
Third-place: 2002, 2010
Southeast Asian Games: Silver medal 2009

References

External links

1953 births
Living people
Sportspeople from Matosinhos
Portuguese footballers
Association football defenders
Primeira Liga players
Leixões S.C. players
AD Fafe players
Portuguese football managers
Primeira Liga managers
Liga Portugal 2 managers
Boavista F.C. managers
S.C. Braga managers
Varzim S.C. managers
Associação Académica de Coimbra – O.A.F. managers
Leixões S.C. managers
F.C. Penafiel managers
G.D. Chaves managers
Rio Ave F.C. managers
F.C. Paços de Ferreira managers
Henrique Calisto
Vietnam national football team managers
Portuguese expatriate football managers
Expatriate football managers in Vietnam
Expatriate football managers in Angola
Portuguese expatriate sportspeople in Vietnam